Furcy is a small village near Kenscoff, 30 miles southeast of Port-au-Prince, Haiti.

Hospitality
There are two accommodations in the area: The Lodge, a wooden chalet architecture hotel;Rustik, a bed and breakfast looking out on the mountainside in eco-friendly treehouse hotel/bar, built by the Furcy community after the 2010 earthquake.

References

Populated places in Ouest (department)